Na krásné samotě is a Czech novel by František Bernard Vaněk. It was first published in 1938.

1938 Czech novels